Pierre Marcel Poilievre  (born June 3, 1979) is a Canadian politician who has served as the leader of the Conservative Party of Canada and the leader of the Official Opposition since 2022. Poilievre has served as a member of Parliament (MP) since 2004.

Poilievre studied at the University of Calgary, earning a Bachelor of Arts degree in international relations. He then worked as an advisor to Canadian Alliance leader Stockwell Day. Poilievre was first elected to the House of Commons following the 2004 federal election; he at first represented the Ottawa-area riding of Nepean—Carleton and then represented the re-established riding of Carleton. He served as minister for democratic reform for 2013 to 2015 and then as minister of employment and social development in 2015. From 2017 to 2022, Poilievre served as the shadow minister for finance and briefly as the shadow minister for jobs and industry. He ran for leader of the Conservative Party in its 2022 leadership election, winning on the first ballot. Poilievre has been described as a libertarian and populist.

Early life

Background and childhood
Poilievre was born on June 3, 1979, in Calgary, Alberta to a 16-year-old mother, who was of Irish Canadian descent on her father's side. Poilievre was adopted by  schoolteachers Marlene and Donald Poilievre, who is French Canadian, shortly after being born. Poilievre was raised in a modest household in suburban Calgary. He played ice hockey and went on camping trips with his younger brother, Patrick, who had also been adopted from their biological mother by Marlene and Donald.

Growing up, Poilievre worked as a paperboy for the Calgary Sun. He attended Henry Wise Wood High School, and was on a wrestling team until he was forced to stop due to a temporary shoulder tendinitis injury, at the age of 14. Following the injury, Poilievre attended an Alberta Tory riding-association meeting as a new hobby. As a result, he became interested in politics and started reading political books, including Milton Friedman's Capitalism and Freedom, a book that greatly influenced his politics. 

Poilievre became active in the Reform Party and the Progressive Conservative Association of Alberta by participating in meetings of both parties. At the age of 16, Poilievre sold Reform Party memberships for Jason Kenney and also did telephone canvassing for him. He also knocked on doors for political campaigns and served on a riding association. Shortly after turning 17 years old, Poilievre was a delegate to the Reform Party 1996 national convention in Vancouver, British Columbia. Poilievre's parents, Marlene and Donald, who had married in 1971, separated when he was in his mid-teens. Poilievre's father, Donald, later came out as a gay man.

University and early jobs
As an older teenager, Poilievre had a job at Telus doing corporate collections by calling businesses. He also later worked briefly as a journalist for Alberta Report, a conservative weekly magazine. At the University of Calgary, Poilievre studied international relations, following a period of study in commerce. At the age of 19, Poilievre staged a protest against a student union that tried to prevent campus Reform Party supporters from campaigning for their candidate in an Alberta Senate election. Poilievre was one of many Reform members on campus in conflict with the federal Progressive Conservative Party of Canada, who they believed to be unprincipled.

As a second-year student, in 1999, Poilievre submitted an essay to Magna International's "As Prime Minister, I Would...", essay contest. His essay, titled "Building Canada Through Freedom", focused on the subject of individual freedom and among other things, argued for a two-term limit for all members of Parliament. As a finalist, Poilievre won $10,000 and won a four-month internship at Magna, with the essay being published in the book that collected the essays titled @Stake — "As Prime Minister, I Would..." 

Poilievre was president of the Young Tories at the University of Calgary, a club composed of both Progressive Conservative and Reform members focused on Alberta politics, where he clashed with Patrick Brown who was the president of the national Progressive Conservative Youth Federation at the time. Their dispute was over Progressive Conservative leader Joe Clark, whom Poilievre considered to be anti-youth.  Concerned that anti-Clark members would be removed, as Brown was an executive for the Progressive Conservatives, Poilievre threatened to shift the Progressive Conservative club to the United Alternative. Media outlets had obtained a leaked memo of Brown planning to remove anti-Clark youth leaders, but Brown denied it, leading Poilievre to back down from his threat.

Canadian Alliance work
In his early twenties, Poilievre eventually met both his biological mother and his maternal grandfather for the first time. In 2000, Poilievre was an organizer on a website called Organization to Draft Stockwell Day, seeking to recruit Alberta Treasurer Stockwell Day to be the leader of the Canadian Alliance party. With Day running in the leadership election, Poilievre and his young colleagues made phone calls to canvas and raise money, dubbing themselves as the "Fight Club". 

After Day's tenure as Leader of the Official Opposition, Poilievre left Calgary and university without graduating to work for Day as an advisor in 2002, but returned to graduate with a Bachelor of Arts degree in 2008. After Jean Chrétien announced he would retire as prime minister of Canada in 2002, Poilievre and Ezra Levant, who practised law at the time, wrote an op-ed advocating for the merger of the Canadian Alliance and the Progressive Conservative parties. When Levant was campaigning to replace Preston Manning in 2002 Calgary Southwest by-election, Poilievre was his campaign spokesperson until Levant withdrew in order to allow Stephen Harper to run. 

In 2003, Poilievre founded a company called 3D Contact Inc. with his partner Jonathan Denis, who would become Alberta Cabinet Minister years later. Their company focused on providing political communications, polling and research services. After founding the company, Poilievre ran for MP as part of the new Conservative Party of Canada, which had just merged from the Canadian Alliance and Progressive Conservatives.

Political career

Early political career (2004–2013) 
With preparations being made for the 2004 Canadian federal election, the 24-year old Manordale resident Poilievre won the Conservative Party nomination in the riding of Nepean—Carleton to contest incumbent David Pratt of the Liberal Party of Canada. Though Pratt was a two-term incumbent and cabinet minister, the election was projected to be close between the two. Poilievre won his riding and his Conservative Party formed the Official Opposition to a Liberal Party minority government. Poilievre entered the 38th Canadian Parliament at the age of 25 along with Andrew Scheer as the youngest members of the Conservative caucus. Poilievre introduced himself and his young colleagues to media outlets as "libertarian-minded" members of the party. Poilievre was given the nickname "Skippy" early in his political career.

Poilievre took up the cause of the Queensway Carleton Hospital which was in the midst of an expansion project while facing provincial funding reductions for operations and an increase in rent as its lease with the National Capital Commission was set to expire in 2013. Seeking to eliminate the rent the hospital paid, Poilievre introduced, on June 20, 2005, a private member Bill C-414, titled An Act to  prevent the Government of Canada from charging rent to non-profit hospitals. The bill was defeated in a vote of 165–111 but with Nepean—Carleton MPP John Baird they advocated the hospital only pay a $1 per year rent and implemented that once Baird became President of the Treasury Board the next year.

Poilievre also sponsored private member Bill C-383, introduced on May 11, 2005, to create a means to recall Members of Parliament through a petition, and Bill C-456, on November 24, 2005, to insert parental responsibility into the Criminal Code by making it an offence for a parent to contribute through negligence, inappropriate action or lack of appropriate action to behaviour that results in their child committing an offence.

Poilievre also voiced opposition to the appointment of Michaëlle Jean as the Governor General of Canada by taking an issue with Jean's past support of Quebec sovereignty movement. Poilievre took out a petition asking the Queen of Canada to dismiss Jean's appointment. After the death of Elizabeth II in 2022, Jean said that the Queen dismissed Poilievre's petition over the Queen's belief that she can not intervene in Canadian affairs.

In Government
Poilievre won reelection in the 2006 Canadian federal election with over 50% of the vote. The Conservative Party formed a minority government. Entering the 39th Canadian Parliament at the age of 26, he still remained the youngest MP in the House of Commons. Prime Minister Stephen Harper appointed Poilievre to act as Parliamentary Secretary to the President of the Treasury Board, who was his fellow Nepean-area Conservative MP John Baird. Poilievre's parliamentary work included overseeing the drafting and adoption of the Federal Accountability Act.

Addressing the prime minister's apology on behalf of the Canadian government for the Canadian Indian residential school system, Poilievre made remarks to CFRA News Talk Radio regarding the financial compensation and the residential school survivors, for which he later apologized. He stated he did not think Canada was "getting value for all this money", instead "we need to engender the values of hard work and independence and self-reliance." Poilievre apologized in Parliament the next day, saying, "Mr. Speaker, I rise today to offer a full apology to aboriginal people, to the House and to all Canadians. Yesterday, on a day when the House and all Canadians were celebrating a new beginning, I made remarks that were hurtful and wrong. I accept responsibility for them, and I apologize."

In the 2008 Canadian federal election, Poilievre, now a Barrhaven resident, was again re-elected with over 50% of the vote in his Nepean–Carleton riding with his party forming another minority government. For the 40th Canadian Parliament, Prime Minister Stephen Harper appointed Poilievre as Parliamentary Secretary to the Prime Minister. After the prime minister decided Canada would boycott the Durban Review Conference due to concerns of anti-Semitic rhetoric, Poilievre and Liberal Party MP Irwin Cotler were sent to Geneva, Switzerland, to attend the alternative Conference Against Racism, Discrimination, and Persecution. Poilievre went on to Poland for the March of the Living. He was assigned to be a member of the Special Panel on Employment Insurance tasked by Harper and Liberal Party leader Michael Ignatieff to address resulting impacts of 2008 financial crisis with compromise that would avoid election. He was also assigned to the Information, Privacy and Ethics Committee where he expressed concern over camera surveillance, like Google Street View, and called for CEO of Google Eric Schmidt to testify.

Poilievre became referred to as the Conservative Party's "attack dog". Following the 2009 Liberal Party of Canada leadership election he sent a letter to the Commissioner of Canada Elections alleging contraventions of federal regulations concerning fundraising. In 2010, a police probe was triggered after Poilievre drove through a Parliament Hill screening gate without waiting for the RCMP to permit his entry and open the gate. Instead, he pressed the entrance button himself and drove his vehicle through. After Poilievre was identified as the driver and the incident was reported on in the media, he apologized.

As in 2006 and 2008, Poilievre won re-election in Nepean–Carleton with over 50% of the vote. For this 41st Canadian Parliament, the Conservative Party formed a majority government and Prime Minister Harper appointed him as Parliamentary Secretary to the Minister of Transport, Infrastructure and Communities (Denis Lebel) and for the Federal Economic Development Agency for Southern Ontario (FedDev Ontario) — assisting Gary Goodyear and Steven Fletcher.

In early September 2012, while serving on the FedDev Ontario, Poilievre echoed then-Ontario MPP Randy Hillier's calls for ending workers' mandatory union payments. When asked in 2012 if his advocacy was akin to right-to-work laws implemented in some parts of the United States, Poilievre described it as an "enhancement of workers rights and freedoms". Hillier had developed his arguments for the right-to-work in his June 2012 White Paper for the province of Ontario, "Paths to Prosperity: Flexible Labour Markets" . 

In early 2013, both Poilievre, at the federal level, and Hillier, at the provincial level, had called for greater transparency regarding union finances by citing the way in which the National Capital Region branch of the Public Service Alliance of Canada had supported the Parti Québécois in the 2012 provincial elections, and unions had supported the student protests using union funds. Poilievre, wrote forcefully against the application of the 1946 Rand formula used in Canadian labour law, which stems from a Supreme Court ruling that allows unions to collect mandatory dues from workers in exchange for the union's support for worker grievances. The formula was crafted in response to the 99-day Windsor Ford Strike by returned World War II veterans and other workers led by the United Automobile Workers of Canada (UAW) at the Ford Motor Company facilities in Windsor, Ontario. Poilievre's offensive against the mandatory paying of union dues by federal public servants, was relatively short-lived. 

Thousands of public servants who were union members, were in his riding. To union supporters, Polievre's call to end the mandatory union fees raised concerns that cutting off revenue to unions would weaken unions. Some called the right-to-work argument, the right-to-work-for-less. Russ Hiebert's private member's bill, C-377, An Act to Amend the Income Tax Act (labour organizations), passed into law in June 2015, making union fees optional; it was one of the last pieces of legislation before the end of  Harper's premiership. By December 2015, the bill was no longer in force, and it was finally repealed in June 2017.

Cabinet minister (2013–2015)

Minister of State for Democratic Reform 

Harper shuffled his cabinet, adding several new members, including Poilievre to replace Tim Uppal as minister of state for democratic reform. With the 2011 Canadian federal election voter suppression scandal concluding, the Canadian Senate expenses scandal enfolding, and the Senate Reform Act (to allow each province to recommend senate candidates and impose a maximum 9-year term limit) paused at second reading to hear from the Supreme Court of Canada as to its constitutionality, this position was seen by the media as being one of toughest in the cabinet and consequential to the Conservative Party. After the Supreme Court unanimously ruled that the Senate Reform Act would require substantial provincial consent, and Harper ruled out the use of a national referendum, reform efforts were abandoned. 

After Justin Trudeau, leader of the Liberal Party which controlled the second most senate seats, began unilaterally implementing his senate reform plan of making senators independent with a non-partisan appointment process, Poilievre dismissed the measures maintaining senators should be elected.

On February 4, 2014, as Minister of State, Poilievre introduced Bill C-23, known as the Fair Elections Act, into the House of Commons. Among other provisions, the bill expanded the types of identification which were accepted in order to vote, and eliminated the vouching system, whereby a voter can vote without an ID and have an acquaintance 'vouch' for them. The bill was opposed by former-chief electoral officer Jean-Pierre Kingsley, former-auditor general Sheila Fraser, and dozens of Canadian and international political experts — Poilievre stepped up his attacks on Marc Mayrand, the chief electoral officer of Elections Canada at the time, by accusing him of wanting "more power, a bigger budget and less accountability." The bill was passed and received royal assent.

Also as minister of state, Poilievre introduced Bill C-50, known as the Citizen Voting Act, into the House of Commons in December 2014. The bill was the government's response to a Ontario Superior Court's ruling, which was appealed to the Supreme Court as Frank v Canada (AG), which had determined the disfranchisement of expatriates who have lived abroad for more than five years was unconstitutional. Bill C-50 instead proposed to insert additional documentation requirements for expatriates to be able to vote. However, it was not adopted before the end of the Parliament in August 2015.

Minister of Employment and Social Development 
In a small cabinet shuffle, instigated by the decision of Foreign Affairs Minister John Baird to not seek re-election, the prime minister promoted Poilievre, on February 9, 2015, to a ministerial position. He replaced Jason Kenney as minister of employment and social development and took on Baird's role as minister responsible for the National Capital Commission while keeping his duties as the minister responsible for democratic reform. Also at that time, the National Capital Commission was pursuing the development of the Memorial to the Victims of Communism – Canada, a Land of Refuge and trying to decide where to locate it; Poilievre advocated for the site adjacent to the Supreme Court of Canada building.

In July 2015, Poilievre announced an expansion of a child care benefit program. During the announcement, he wore a Conservative Party of Canada shirt, stated that the payments were from "our Conservative government," and said that "if the Liberals and NDP were to take office they would take the benefits away and raise taxes." Later in 2017, the elections commissioner determined that the occasion was akin to a Conservative party campaign event, rather than a Government of Canada announcement. As the government spent approximately $4,800 related to the event, it was essentially "a de facto non-monetary contribution" to the Conservative party. The commissioner ruled that this was a campaign finance violation, as Poilievre had "knowingly circumvent[ed] the prohibition on contributions to a registered party by ineligible contributors." Poilievre was ordered to post a link to the ruling on his social media.

Opposition MP and shadow minister (2015–2022) 

Locally, Nepean was carved out of his riding in the 2012 Canadian federal electoral redistribution, so Poilievre moved from Barrhaven to Greely to seek election in the more rural Carleton riding. Poilievre narrowly won the seat with 46% of the vote, but the Conservative Party only won enough seats to form the Official Opposition to a Liberal Party majority government.

Following Harper's resignation, interim party leader Rona Ambrose made Poilievre the Conservative Party critic on issues relating to the Treasury Board until October 2016 when she moved him to critic on issues relating to Employment, Labour and Work Opportunity. In August 2017, new party leader Andrew Scheer selected Poilievre to be critic of the Minister of Finance, with Tom Kmiec as deputy critic. In that role Poilievre introduced his third private member's bill (Bill C-395) which sought to amend the Federal–Provincial Arrangements Act in such a way that it would eliminate personal income taxes and payroll taxes that apply to persons with disabilities. Though it gained the support of the New Democratic Party, the bill was defeated at consider of 2nd Reading with both the Liberal Party and Bloc Québécois/Québec debout voting against. During this parliament, Poilievre travelled to Dieppe as part of a Canadian delegation to commemorate the 75th anniversary ceremonies of the Dieppe Raid. In the lead-up to the next election, Poilievre used all the House of Commons time allotted for debating the 2019 Canadian federal budget to deliver one 4-day long speech to promote the SNC-Lavalin affair.

Poilievre was again re-elected in 2019, this time by a wider margin of the vote compared to his 2015 victory.

After Scheer's resignation as party leader, Poilievre was initially considered to be one of the front-runners to win the subsequent leadership election. Poilievre considered a bid and started to assemble a campaign team, though he announced he would not run on January 23, 2020, citing his desire to spend more time with his family.

During the WE Charity scandal surrounding the Liberal Party, Poilievre was one of the Conservative Party's primary interrogators. Poilievre repeatedly questioned Prime Minister Trudeau in a virtual conference in July, asking for the exact dollar figure that his family was paid by the WE Charity. Trudeau responded that he did not know the number on hand. In August, Poilievre revealed to journalists WE Charity memos that had been blacked-out by the Liberal government, tossing each of them aside. After having pressured Finance Minister Bill Morneau to resign for his involvement in the scandal, Morneau announced his resignation on August 17.

Scheer's successor, Erin O'Toole, kept Poilievre as finance critic until February 10, 2021, when he was replaced with Ed Fast. Poilievre then became critic for jobs and industry, though he only held this position for a short time as he regained his old position as finance critic on November 9, 2021. Poilievre won re-election in Carleton in the 2021 federal election.

2022 leadership campaign

After O'Toole was ousted as leader through a leadership review on February 2, 2022, there was speculation of Poilievre entering the leadership election to succeed him. On February 5, 2022, Poilievre implicitly declared his intention to run in the leadership election, stating "I'm running for Prime Minister". Political commentators and journalists described Poilievre as the frontrunner in the leadership race. Poilievre's campaign was described as being centred on freedom and reducing the cost of living. He stated his desire to make Canada the "freest country in the world".

Poilievre had been critical of fellow leadership candidates Jean Charest and Patrick Brown, who were seen to be part of the moderate faction of the Conservative Party; Poilievre accused Charest of being a Liberal and stated that Brown's support for a carbon tax is "disqualifying". From the end of June to early July, Poilievre's campaign aired attack ads on Brown in local Toronto television stations, criticizing his policies as mayor of Brampton.

On June 4, Poilievre's campaign announced they sold 311,958 out of the 678,708 total memberships during the leadership race. Poilievre had been endorsed for the leadership by 62 Conservative MPs, more than half of the party's then 119-member caucus in the House of Commons. On July 25, Poilievre received an endorsement from former Prime Minister Stephen Harper. On August 2, Poilievre's campaign announced they fundraised $4,042,717 through 36,804 individual donors in the second quarter of the leadership race; this amount was more than half of the $7,538,549 fundraised by the six candidates combined.

On September 10, Poilievre won the leadership on the first ballot, with 68.15% of points and 70.7% of the vote share. It was the first first-ballot victory since the party's 2004 leadership election. Poilievre also won 330 out of 338 electoral districts.

Opposition leader (2022–present) 
On September 12, Poilievre gave his first speech to his caucus as leader. The following day on September 13, Poilievre unveiled his House of Commons leadership team with nine members, including deputy leaders Melissa Lantsman and Tim Uppal. 

On October 6, it was reported that between 2018 and 2022, Poilievre's team-managed YouTube channel posted hundreds of videos with a hidden tag labeled "MGTOW", referencing the misogynistic online community. Poilievre condemned MGTOW, said he was unaware of the tags, and had his team immediately remove the tags.

On October 12, Poilievre unveiled a 71-member shadow cabinet, including former leadership rivals Leslyn Lewis and Scott Aitchison.

Poilievre and his Conservatives put forward a motion in November to audit federal COVID-19 spending including the ArriveCAN app which had been criticized. The motion passed resulting in an audit of the federal government's spending. The auditor found that "overpayments of $4.6 billion were made to ineligible individuals" and "at least $27.4 billion in payments to individuals and employers" to be further investigated. In December, Liberal MPs criticized the audit for being done for partisan reasons and "political games" while Conservative MPs defended the independence of the auditor.

In January 2023, Poilievre called for a parliamentary probe into the Liberal government's relationship with McKinsey & Company due to a report showing value of federal contracts increased from $2.2 million to $66 million after the Liberals formed government.

Political positions 
Poilievre has described himself as a libertarian and a "true conservative". Journalists have also described him as libertarian. Some journalists have described him as populist. However, many have dismissed the label due to Poilievre's pro-choice, pro-immigration, and pro-same-sex-marriage positions.

Economic policy 
Poilievre argues that large budget deficits are the reason for inflation. Poilievre proposes implementing a pay-as-you-go law, requiring the government to offset any new spending with a cut elsewhere. He referred to the success of pay-as-you-go balancing the budget in the United States under the Clinton administration.

Poilievre supports normalizing cryptocurrencies including Bitcoin, which he believes is an inflation hedge. He stated he wants to make Canada the "blockchain capital of the world" and believes the federal government is ruining the Canadian dollar.

Poilievre has criticized the Bank of Canada, accusing it of being "financially illiterate" for forecasting that there would be deflation as opposed to inflation, after his warning to them about inflation in 2020. The bank's deputy governor Paul Beaudry responded by stating "The aspect that we should be held accountable is exactly right," and also listed the war in Ukraine and supply-chain bottlenecks due to the COVID-19 pandemic as the most significant influences on inflation. Poilievre has said that the bank's governor, Tiff Macklem, is Liberal Prime Minister Justin Trudeau's "personal ATM" in terms of printing money to fund deficit spending for the pandemic. Poilievre stated that a government led by him would dismiss Macklem, audit the bank, and ban the bank's potential digital currency.

Following the Rogers-Shaw merger, Poilievre stated that Canada needed more telecommunications competition and proposed for there to be at least "four competitors in every single marketplace".

Poilievre supports defunding the Canadian Broadcasting Corporation (CBC), saying the government could save a billion dollars by doing so. He proposes to convert the CBC's headquarters into affordable housing and other federal buildings into condominium housing.

Housing and infrastructure
Poilievre blames bureaucracy for a lack of new housing, and proposes requiring big cities with unaffordable housing to increase their amount of new homes built by 15 percent anually, in order to continue receiving full federal infrastructure money. Big cities that fail to keep up with the construction target would be withheld funds by the percentage they fall short, while those that meet the target would also be compensated up to $10,000 for every additional new home built. He also proposes compensating other smaller cities for building extra housing too. Poilievre also plans to sell off 15 percent of the government's 37,000 buildings he considers to be under-utilized, so that they can be converted into affordable housing instead.

Poilievre stated that a government led by him would permit a runway expansion at Billy Bishop Toronto City Airport, allowing jets to fly in and out of the airport. Poilievre cited increased competition in the aviation industry and travellers being provided with an alternative to Toronto's Pearson International Airport which had dealt with congestion and flight delays surpassing 50% around the month of July 2022.

Environment and energy 
Poilievre is in favour of addressing climate change by using green technology and placing targets to reduce carbon-related emissions, opposed to using taxes. One of the technologies he plans to incentivize is carbon capture and storage. Poilievre also plans to increase the production of electric cars by greenlighting more mining of lithium, cobalt and copper required to produce the cars and batteries. When speaking in Quebec, he called for less "red tape" and stated that he would permit more construction of hydro-electric dams. Poilievre believes Canadian energy is cleaner than that of other countries, and proposes a ban on importing foreign oil and a review of all pipeline projects cancelled by the current government.

Poilievre pledges to repeal the Liberal government's carbon tax if the Conservatives form government under him. Poilievre also favours repealing two bills that he describes as "anti-energy": Bill C-48 (a law prohibiting oil tankers of a certain size from docking along the north coast of British Columbia) and Bill C-69 (a law assessing Canada's environment).

Foreign policy 
During the spring and summer of 2020, Poilievre was critical of what he perceived as the Trudeau government's misplaced trust in the Communist Party of China, who cancelled the CanSino vaccine contract with Canada. Poilievre insisted that Canada should create its own vaccines supply, and make purchase agreements with more trustworthy governments. Following the reports of Chinese election interference from Canadian Security Intelligence Service documents reported by the Globe and Mail in 2023, Poilievre called for a public registry for agents of foreign regimes who interfere in Canada's elections.

In response to the 2022 Russian invasion of Ukraine, Poilievre stated that a government led by him would support Ukraine by bringing in more Ukrainian refugees, providing more weapons to aid to Ukraine, and by supplying Europe with Canada's energy and oil through LNG Canada to help reduce Europe's dependency on energy from Russia. Poilievre disagrees with putting a no-fly zone on Ukraine because he does not want to escalate Canada going to war.

Poilievre said that a government led by him would ban his Cabinet ministers from participating in the World Economic Forum (WEF), stating that the forum "is against the interests of our people".

Social issues 
Poilievre supports abortion rights. He stated that government led by him would not introduce and would not pass any legislation restricting access to abortion, though he would allow his caucus to have free votes on legislation. In 2010, however, he supported a bill that would have criminalized pressuring a person to get an abortion and a motion where Parliament would have studied when a fetus should be considered a human. In 2020, he changed his position and said that a government led by him would never introduce a bill on the topic, and no private ones would be adopted. In 2021, Poilievre opposed a private member bill prohibiting sex-selective abortion.

Poilievre supports same-sex marriage; in a 2020 interview, he called it a "success" and stated "I voted against it 15 years ago. But I learned a lot". In 2005, he gave a speech opposing same-sex marriage while favouring civil unions as an alternative and voted in favour on the motion to introduce legislation to re-instate an opposite-sex only definition of marriage in 2006. He had also requested Finance Minister Jim Flaherty withhold money spent on sex reassignment surgery from Canada Health Transfer payments. In 2021, Poilievre voted in favour of banning conversion therapy in a free vote.

Poilievre supports maintaining the legalization of soft drugs such as marijuana, while he opposes the decriminalization of "hard drugs", stating "We’re not talking about marijuana here we’re talking about highly lethal drugs that can stop a person's heart". He advocated for more treatment and recovery for those suffering from addictions which are "deadly" and that drug dealers should be facing "strong policing & tough sentences". Poilievre plans to fund treatment and recovery for addicts by suing the pharmaceutical companies responsible for the opioid epedemic.

Poilievre stated that he is in favour of freedom of speech and seeks to repeal Bill C-11 (Online Streaming Act) and the successor to Bill C-36 (Act to amend the Criminal Code and the Canadian Human Rights Act), describing them as censorship in Canada. Poilievre plans to remove the proposed "digital safety commissioner" position with the introduction of what he titles as the "Free Speech Act" and would leave enforcement of crimes commited online to law enforcement. Poilievre stated a government led by him would scrap direct federal research and other grants to universities if they do not commit to section 2(b) of the Charter of Rights and Freedoms, which protects freedom of expression. Poilievre also stated he would appoint a 'Free Speech Guardian' (on the condition that they are a former judge) that would ensure compliance to section 2(b), investigate claims of academic censorship, report to the federal government on the universities that refuse to uphold the Charter right, and recommend cuts to direct federal grants to universities that do not uphold the right.

Poilievre announced his support of those in the Canada convoy protest who were protesting peacefully, while denouncing the individuals who were promoting extremism. Poilievre believes that the federal government abused its power by invoking the Emergencies Act during the convoy protests and proposes limiting its power to prevent it from being used similarly in the future.

Immigration 
Poilievre describes himself as pro-immigration and seeks to put forward policies aiming to speed up processing times for immigration to reunite families, keep refugees safe, and get jobs filled in Canada. Poilievre stated that a government led by him would negotiate agreements with provinces to license qualified professionals within 60 days of receiving applications, provide study loans to aid new immigrants in passing examinations, and permit immigrants to receive licences before moving to Canada.

Healthcare
Poilievre supports Canada's public healthcare, stating "I believe everybody should be able to get public health care. That's the system I've relied on my whole life." Poilievre plans to address healthcare shortages in Canada by ensuring provinces expedite the approval of professional credentials of certified immigrants to increase the number of health care providers, such as nurses. Poilievre pledged to uphold Justin Trudeau's healthcare funding set in 2023 for the pronvinces, but shared pronvincial premiers' criticisms of the funding being too low and he blamed Trudeau for overspending elsewhere.

In 2022, Poilievre introduced private members Bill C-377, Prevention of Government-imposed Vaccination Mandates Act, which would end federally enforced COVID-19-related vaccine mandates.

In October 2022, Poilievre voted in support of a Conservative private member's bill to change the Criminal Code, prohibiting the act of coercing health professionals to euthanize patients in medical assistance in dying, with the aim of upholding "freedom of conscience" in section 2(a) of the Charter of Rights and Freedoms. The bill was defeated when all Liberal, NDP and Bloc members voted against it.

Firearms
Poilievre opposes re-establishing the long-gun registry, and opposes the May 1, 2020 Order in Council that banned over 1,500 models of firearms. Poilievre believes the solution to gun violence in Canada is stronger policing of gun smuggling, opposed to placing further restrictions on licensed firearms owners and sports shooters.

Personal life

After moving to Ottawa, Poilievre dated Conservative political advisor Jenni Byrne until 2011. In January 2018, Poilievre married Anaida Galindo, a Senate aide, in a ceremony in Portugal. Their first child, a daughter, was born on October 17, 2018. On September 12, 2021, Poilievre welcomed his second child, a son.

Poilievre is bilingual, speaking fluent English and French. Poilievre's Fransaskois father, Donald, taught him to preserve French speaking from an early age.

Electoral history

References

External links
Pierre Poilievre

|-

|-

|-

|-

|-

|-

1979 births
Living people
21st-century Canadian politicians
Canadian adoptees
Canadian libertarians
Canadian people of Irish descent
Conservative Party of Canada MPs
Franco-Albertan people
Franco-Ontarian people
Leaders of the Conservative Party of Canada
Leaders of the Opposition (Canada)
Members of the 28th Canadian Ministry
Members of the House of Commons of Canada from Ontario
Members of the King's Privy Council for Canada
Politicians from Calgary
Politicians from Ottawa